Poropuntius opisthoptera is a species of ray-finned fish in the genus Poropuntius which has been recorded from a single locality in the drainage of the Salween (known as the Nujiang in China) in Yunnan. This species may be threatened by the building of dams.

References 

opisthoptera
Taxa named by Wu Hsien-Wen
Fish described in 1977
Taxobox binomials not recognized by IUCN